Farmoor Reservoir is a reservoir at Farmoor, Oxfordshire, England, about 5 miles (8 km) outside the city of Oxford.  It is close to the east bank of the River Thames.  Like most of the reservoirs in the Thames Valley, it was not formed by damming a valley.  In this case the banks were raised above the local ground level using material excavated from within the bowl of the reservoir.

The reservoir is split into Stage 1 (completed 1967, 4,544 million litres) and Stage 2 (completed 1976, 9,298 million litres).  Among other locations, Farmoor supplies the large town of Swindon, some 25 miles (40 km) to the southwest. The reservoir is filled from the River Thames.

The reservoir is used for sports: fishing (especially fly-fishing for rainbow and brown trout), dinghy sailing, windsurfing and stand up paddle boarding.  Oxford SUP Club (stand-up paddle boarding), Oxford Sailing Club and the Oxford Sail Training Trust are based there. The latter offers sailing, windsurfing and powerboat courses. There is also access for bird watching and walking.

Birds of Farmoor Reservoir

References

External links

Oxford Sailing Club
Oxford Sail Training

1967 establishments in England
Reservoirs in Oxfordshire
Sports venues in Oxfordshire
RFarmoor
Thames Water reservoirs